Teri Meri Kahani (Urdu: تیری میری کہانی) is a 2021 Pakistani romantic comedy television film produced by Abdullah Kadwani and Asad Qureshi under their production house 7th Sky Entertainment and was premiered on Geo Entertainment. It was written by Saima Akram Chaudhry and directed by Aeshun Talish. Teri Meri Kahani marked the debut of Haroon Kadwani in the lead role along with Sehar Khan, Bushra Ansari, Usmaan Peerzada and Jawed Sheikh.

The television film premiered on 3 April 2021 in Pakistan on Geo TV. The telefilm received countrywide praising for its direction, writing, location, cast and cinematography.

Soundtrack 
Teri Meri Kahani consisted of two original soundtracks called Parchai and Mere Khuda. Parchai is composed and performed by the talented Wajhi Farooki while the lyrics are also written by him along with Honey. Mere Khuda is composed and performed by Shani Arshad while the lyrics are penned down by Sabir Zafar. Both the osts are available on Spotify, Saavn, iTunes, Amazon Music, Gaana and many other similar music streaming platforms. Both the OSTs gained positive reaction and have garnered 1 million views on YouTube as of June 2021 since its release.

Track listing 
Following is the listing of complete soundtracks of Teri Meri Kahani.

Reception 
With its release on 3 April 2021, Teri Meri Kahani was able to get 60 GRPS, the highest amongst its competitors. The film was praised for its acting, storyline, direction, music and production.

Digital media 
After the film run on television, Teri Meri Kahani was made available to public through YouTube on Har Pal Geo's official channel. The film garnered six million views within the first week on YouTube.

References

External links 
 
 Watch on YouTube

2021 films
2021 television films
2021 romantic comedy films
Pakistani television films
2020s Urdu-language films
Pakistani romantic comedy films